The UK Government Chief Scientific Adviser (GCSA) is the personal adviser on science and technology-related activities and policies to the Prime Minister and the Cabinet. They are also the head of the Government Office for Science.

The Government Chief Scientific Adviser has a significant public role as the government's most visible scientific expert. This was apparent, for example, during the COVID-19 pandemic, when the GCSA would regularly appeared in television briefings alongside senior government ministers.

Many individual government departments have departmental Chief Scientific Advisers (CSA). The GCSA is involved in recruiting CSAs, and meets regularly with CSAs to identify priorities, challenges and strategies. The adviser also usually serves as chair of the UK's Scientific Advisory Group for Emergencies (SAGE).

List of Government Chief Scientific Advisers
 Sir Solly Zuckerman, 1964–1971
 Sir Alan Cottrell, 1971–1974
 Robert Press, 1974–1976
 Sir John Ashworth, 1977–1981
 Sir Robin Nicholson, 1982–1985 
 Sir John Fairclough, 1986–1990
 Sir William Stewart, 1990–1995
 Sir Robert May, 1995–2000
 Sir David King, 2000–2008
 Sir John Beddington, 2008–2013
 Sir Mark Walport, 2013–2017
 Sir Chris Whitty (interim), 2017–2018
 Sir Patrick Vallance, 2018–2023
 Dame Angela McLean, 2023-

See also
 Chief Medical Officer in the United Kingdom
 Chief Scientific Officer for England
 MoD Chief Scientific Adviser
 Government Office for Science
 Frederick Lindemann, 1st Viscount Cherwell
 Chief Science Advisor in Canada

References

External links
 
 
  – A discussion at the Royal Society, 2001.

1964 establishments in the United Kingdom
United K
Civil service positions in the United Kingdom
Department for Business, Energy and Industrial Strategy
Science and technology in the United Kingdom